Martignat is a commune in the Ain department in the Auvergne-Rhône-Alpes region in eastern France.

Politics and administration

Population

See also
Communes of the Ain department

References

Communes of Ain
Ain communes articles needing translation from French Wikipedia